Gávea is a neighborhood located in Rio de Janeiro, Brazil.

Gávea may also refer to:

 Estádio da Gávea, a Brazilian football stadium
 Hipódromo da Gávea, a Brazilian horse racing venue
 Pedra da Gávea, "Rock of the topsail", a large natural formation visible on a seaborne approach to Rio de Janeiro